Sultan Iskandar may refer to:

 Sultan Iskandar Shah, commonly identified with Parameswara (king), 5th and last Raja of Singapura and 1st ruler of the Malacca Sultanate
 Sultan Mahmud Iskandar Shah, 11th Sultan of Perak
 Sultan Iskandar Zulkarnain, 15th Sultan of Perak
 Sultan Iskandar Ibrahim, ruler of Maldives, 17th century Muda (1583-1636), Acehnese ruler (r. 1607-36)
 Sultan Ali Iskandar Shah, or Sultan Ali of Johor (1824–1877), 19th Sultan of Johor
 Iskandar of Perak  (1876–1938), 30th Sultan of Perak
 Iskandar of Johor (1932–2010), 8th Yang di-Pertuan Agong of Malaysia, the 24th Sultan of Johor

See also
Iskandar